Donald or Don Wilson may refer to:

Sportspeople
 Don Wilson (Australian footballer) (1914–2015), Australian footballer
 Don Wilson (footballer, born 1930) (1930–2003), English football player and manager, played for Bury FC
 Don Wilson (cricketer) (1937–2012), English cricketer
 Don Wilson (baseball) (1945–1975), Major League Baseball player for the Houston Astros
 Don Wilson (kickboxer) (born 1954), American actor and kickboxer, nicknamed "The Dragon"
 Don Wilson (gridiron football) (born 1961), gridiron football defensive back
 Donald Wilson (cyclist) (born 1944), Australian cyclist
 Donald Wilson (South African soccer), active in the 1940s

Others
 Don Wilson (announcer) (1900–1982), American announcer and occasional actor in radio and television
 Don Wilson (Colorado politician), American politician
 Don W. Wilson (born 1942), former Archivist of the United States
 Don Wilson (1933–2022), musician with the Ventures
 Don M. Wilson III (born 1948), American banker and risk management specialist
 Don Wilson (pastor) (born 1949), founder and senior pastor of Christ's Church of the Valley in Peoria
 Don E. Wilson (born 1944), American zoologist
 Donald Wilson (general) (1892–1978), United States Army Air Forces general during World War II
 Donald Wilson (writer and producer) (1910–2002), British television writer and producer
 H. Donald Wilson (1923–2006), American founder of LexisNexis
 Donald R. Wilson (1917–1983), justice of the Supreme Court of Appeals of West Virginia
 Donald Roller Wilson (born 1938), American artist
 Donald Erwin Wilson (1932–2002), U.S. Navy admiral
 Donald Cumming Wilson (1898–1950), Scottish chemist
 J. Donald Wilson (1904–1984), radio and film writer, producer, and voice actor

See also
 Don Willson (1913–1967), Canadian ice hockey player